Alok Kapali (born 1 January 1984) is a Bangladeshi cricketer. He is an allrounder who bats in the middle to lower order and bowls leg spin. He was the first Bangladeshi to take a Test hat-trick.

Early life and background
Kapali was born into a Bengali Hindu family in Sylhet, Bangladesh. He is the youngest of six brothers and four sisters in his family. His father worked at a Hindu temple in his hometown, Sylhet.

International career

Test career

Kapali made his Test debut in 2002, against Sri Lanka at Colombo. He took 2 wickets, Michael Vandort and Upul Chandana as well as making 39 and 23 with the bat. In his next 16 Tests he took just 4 more wickets and this included a hat-trick against Pakistan in 2003. This was spread over two overs, and when he trapped Umar Gul LBW with the first ball of his 3rd over Kapali became the first Bangladeshi bowler to achieve the milestone in Test cricket, and the youngest of all time, at the age of 19 years 240 days. He finished with figures of 3/3. His effort in quickly cleaning up the tail also allowed gave Bangladesh their maiden first innings lead in Tests.

With the bat Kapali has struggled thus far in Test cricket and made his highest score of 85 against the West Indies at Chittagong.

Kapali has the unfortunate distinction of playing for the losing side in all 17 of his Test matches for Bangladesh.

One Day Internationals
In One Day International cricket he has been in and out of the side, impressing more with the bat than the ball. He hit the fastest century by a Bangladeshi batsmen (86 deliveries) in a match against India during the 2008 Asia cup., a record bettered by Shakib Al Hasan two years later. He also holds the Bangladeshi record 7th wicket partnership of 89 with Khaled Mashud, made against Kenya in 2006.One Day International Cricket - Partnership Records (Countries & Grounds)

Domestic career
Kapali scored 3 hundreds for Sylhet in the Bangladeshi National Cricket League of 2006–07, finishing with 744 runs.

He was the leading run-scorer in the 2016–17 National Cricket League tournament, with 598 runs, including a career-best of 200 not out in the final match of the competition.

In January 2018, he scored his 20th century in first-class cricket, batting for East Zone against Central Zone, in the 2017–18 Bangladesh Cricket League.

ICL career
In 2008, Kapali was banned for 10-years for playing international cricket because he joined the unsanctioned Indian Cricket League and played for the Dhaka Warriors in the Indian Cricket League. He scored the first century in the two seasons of ICL, 100 in 60 balls, against Hyderabad Heroes. He finished as the second highest scorer of the league stage with 324 runs in 8 matches at an average of 54. However Kapali announced he quit the ICL in June 2009 and was available for national selection by 31 December 2009

BPL career
The Bangladesh Cricket Board founded the six-team Bangladesh Premier League in 2012, a twenty20 tournament to be held in February that year. The BCB made Alok Kapali the 'icon player' for Sylhet Royals. He scored 124 runs from 9 matches.

Later he also played for several BPL teams, while his innings during final match of 2015–16 Bangladesh Premier League on behalf of Comilla Victorians was extraordinary.

In October 2018, he was named in the squad for the Sylhet Sixers team, following the draft for the 2018–19 Bangladesh Premier League. In November 2019, he was selected to play for the Rajshahi Royals in the 2019–20 Bangladesh Premier League.

References

External links

1984 births
Living people
Bangladesh One Day International cricketers
Bangladesh Test cricketers
Bangladesh Twenty20 International cricketers
Test cricket hat-trick takers
Bangladeshi cricketers
Bangladeshi Hindus
21st-century Bangladeshi cricketers
Sylhet Division cricketers
People from Sylhet
Fortune Barishal cricketers
Comilla Victorians cricketers
Brothers Union cricketers
Legends of Rupganj cricketers
Gazi Group cricketers
Prime Bank Cricket Club cricketers
ICL Bangladesh XI cricketers
Dhaka Warriors cricketers
Bangladesh East Zone cricketers
Khulna Tigers cricketers
Sylhet Strikers cricketers